Loughnane is a surname. Notable people with the surname include:

Bill Loughnane (1915–1982), Irish politician
Brian Loughnane (born 1957), Australian businessman and political advisor
Francis Loughnane (born 1945), Irish hurler
Ger Loughnane (born 1953), Irish hurler
Lee Loughnane (born 1956), American musician and songwriter
Michael Loughnane (1867-?), Australian politician
Olive Loughnane (born 1976), Irish race walker
Susan Loughnane (born 1987), Irish actress